Patchogue is a village in Suffolk County, New York. The population was 11,798 at the time of the 2010 census. Patchogue is part of the town of Brookhaven, on the south shore of Long Island, adjoining Great South Bay. It is officially known as the Incorporated Village of Patchogue.

History 

In 1812 there were 75 inhabitants in Patchogue according to The Brooklyn Eagle, published in 1930.

The Patchogue Former Manufactured Gas Plant (MGP) was operated from 1904 to 1926. The company was a small operation, converting coal and/or petroleum products to a flammable gas for use in lighting and industry. The company was sold to Long Island Lighting Company (LILCO).

The Patchogue Theatre opened in 1923. It was later renovated into a triplex, after which it was converted to a single movie theater. It closed in the late 1980s. In the mid-1990s the village acquired the theater, and completely refurbished the building; it now seats 1,166 people.

Three churches in Patchogue are listed on the National Register of Historic Places. The Congregational Church on East Main Street, United Methodist Church on South Ocean Avenue between Church Street and Terry Street, and St. Paul's Episcopal Church on Rider Avenue across from Terry Street.  

In 2019, the local downtown area was recognized by the American Planning Association as one of America's four "Great Neighborhoods". Since 2007, the association has recognized over 300 neighborhoods, streets, and public spaces that make communities stronger and bring people together through good planning.

Geography
According to the United States Census Bureau, the village has a total area of 2.5 square miles (6.5 km²), of which 2.2 square miles (5.8 km2) is land and 0.3 square mile (0.7 km2) (10.71%) is water.

A natural riverfront and harbor are resources that the village has utilized since its founding, to become a modern and largely self-contained community.

Demographics

As of the 2000 census, there were 11,919 people, 4,636 households, and 2,749 families residing in the village. The population density was 5,301.2 people per square mile (2,045.3/km2). There were 4,902 housing units at an average density of 2,180.2 per square mile (841.2/km2). The racial makeup of the village was 81.27% White, 3.89% African American, 0.34% Native American, 1.39% Asian, 0.02% Pacific Islander, 9.23% from other races, and 3.85% from two or more races. Hispanics or Latinos of any race were 23.84% of the population.

There were 4,636 households, out of which 29.5% had children under the age of 18 living with them, 40.3% were married couples living together, 13.4% had a female householder with no husband present, and 40.7% were non-families. 31.8% of all households were made up of individuals, and 9.0% had someone living alone who was 65 years of age or older. The average household size was 2.54 and the average family size was 3.20.

22.5% of Patchogue's inhabitants were under the age of 18, 9.2% ranged from 18 and 24, 37.1% from 25 to 44, 20.7% from 45 to 64, and 10.5% were 65 years of age or older. The median age was 35 years. For every 100 females, there were 100.4 males. For every 100 females age 18 and over, there were 99.7 males.

The median income for a household in the village was $47,027, and the median income for a family was $60,126. Males had a median income of $38,561 versus $30,599 for females. The per capita income for the village was $22,962. 8.1% of families and 10.7% of the population were below the poverty threshold, including 13.5% of those under age 18 and 10.4% of those age 65 or over.

In 2010, the demographics were 61.8% White, 29.6% Hispanic, 5.3% Black, 0.3% Native American, 1.6% Asian, 0.1% Some Other Race, and 1.4% Two or More Races.

Economy

The Blue Point Brewing Company is based in Patchogue.

Education

Patchogue and the adjacent hamlet of Medford share a school district and library. There are primary, middle and high schools, plus continuing education programs for adults. The school district, library, and St. Joseph's College provide a variety of educational opportunities. In 2010, the Patchogue-Medford Library was awarded the 2010 National Medal for Museum and Library Science for the library's work in bilingual programming.

Media

The Patchogue newspaper The Long Island Advance dates back to 1871, when Timothy J. Dyson a former newspaper correspondent from Brooklyn, printed the first edition out of a small office on West Main Street.

The news website GreaterPatchogue.com began publication in 2015. It is owned by Greater Long Island Media Group, Inc., an independent company based in Patchogue.

Radio stations Big 98.1, WALK-FM, WBLI, WLID and WNYG are licensed to serve Patchogue.

Transportation

 Patchogue is served by the LIRR Montauk Branch. The station is a hub for several Suffolk County Transit bus lines (the S40, S54, S61, S63, S66, S68, 7A & 7B), as well as the Village of Patchogue Bus.
 Within walking distance of the LIRR station are the Watch Hill Ferry Terminal, which serves the Watch Hill Visitor's Center in the Otis Pike Fire Island High Dune Wilderness, and the Davis Park Ferry Terminal which serves Davis Park, New York, both ferries taking passengers to and from Fire Island.
 The main road through Patchogue is Montauk Highway. Other important roads are (from west to east) County Route 19, South and North Ocean Avenues, the latter of which leads to County Route 83 and New York State Route 112.

Notable people

 Emily Newton Barto, painter, was born in Patchogue
 Walta Borawski, American poet
 Frank Castellano, captain of USS Bainbridge
 Mike Fagan, professional bowler
 Billy Idol, English musician – lived in a house in Patchogue when his family emigrated to the United States in 1958.
 Leila Kenzle, actress – was born in Patchogue (1960)
 Jeffrey R. MacDonald, convicted of killing his wife and daughters, lived in Patchogue and attended Patchogue High School. This story was the focus of the book and television mini-series Fatal Vision
 Biz Markie, rapper – lived in Patchogue
 Chrisette Michele, Patchogue-raised Grammy winner who won a Grammy Award for Best Urban/Alternative Performance in 2009 for her song "Be OK".
 Robert Pelletreau, diplomat and ambassador, born in Patchogue, lawyer from family of prominent judges and lawyers in Patchogue, Pelletreau & Pelletreau.
 Sylvia Porter, journalist – born in Patchogue (1913)
 William T. Sanders, anthropologist specialising in Mesoamerican archaeology, born and grew up in Patchogue.
 Jeff Schaefer, baseball player for Chicago White Sox (1989), born in Patchogue.
 Edgar A. Sharp, United States representative to the Seventy-ninth Congress (1945–1947): born in Patchogue (1876).
 William Stuart-Houston (born William Patrick Hitler), Adolf Hitler's nephew lived on Silver Street, along with his mother Bridget, his wife Phyllis, and his four sons, Alexander, Louis, Howard, and Brian.

See also
 East Patchogue, New York
 Mascot Dock
 North Patchogue, New York
 Patchogue Bay
 Patchogue-Medford High School
 Patchogue-Medford Library
 Patchogue-Medford School District
 Patchogue River
 Patchogue Theatre
 Sandspit Park Beach & Marina
 Shorefront Park

References

Bibliography
 Images of America: Patchogue, by Hans Henke, Patchogue village historian, Arcadia Publishing.
 The Patchogue Story, by historian Anne Swezey, (February 6, 1924 – April 20, 2009)

External links

 Village of Patchogue
 Patchogue—Still Banking on the River article by Rhoda Amon, Newsday staff writer

 
Brookhaven, New York
Villages in Suffolk County, New York
Populated coastal places in New York (state)